Thihoshin Pagoda is a famous Buddhist pagoda in Pakokku, Magway Region, Myanmar. The pagoda was initiated and offered by King Vijayabahu I(Ashoka Rama), king of Sri Lanka, who reigned until 1110. It was completed during the reign of King Alaungsithu (1090-1167). A pagoda festival is held every year between May and June, from the 8th to 10th waxing days of the Burmese month of Nayon.

References

Pagodas in Myanmar